Martha is a silent animated short film made by Walt Disney in 1923 in the Laugh-O-Grams series. It was black and white, and billed as a "Song-O-Gram". It is the only film in the Laugh-O-Gram series that is presumed lost, as no prints are known to exist.

References

1920s Disney animated short films
1923 animated films
1923 films
Films directed by Walt Disney
Films produced by Walt Disney
American black-and-white films
American silent short films
Laugh-O-Gram Studio films
Lost American films
Lost animated films
1923 lost films
1920s American films